Christopher Mark Drury (born 22 June 1952) is a retired British international lightweight rower.

Rowing career
Drury participated in the 1974 World Rowing Championships in Lucerne, competing in the lightweight coxless four event. The crew selected from the Leander Club finished in seventh place overall after winning the B final. In 1975 as part of the lightweight four with Graeme Hall, Nicholas Tee and Daniel Topolski they won a silver medal for Great Britain at the 1975 World Rowing Championships in Nottingham. He was part of the lightweight eight that secured a silver medal at the 1976 World Rowing Championships in Villach, Austria.

He won a gold medal at the 1977 World Rowing Championships in Amsterdam with the lightweight men's eight. The following year he was part of the lightweight eight that successfully defended their title and won the gold medal at the 1978 FISA Lightweight Championships in Copenhagen.

References

1952 births
Living people
British male rowers
World Rowing Championships medalists for Great Britain